Kyneton was an electoral district of the Legislative Assembly in the Australian state of Victoria centred on Kyneton from 1889 to 1904.

The Electoral district of Kyneton Boroughs (1856–1889) preceded the district of Kyneton. Charles Young was the last member for Kyneton Boroughs, representing the district from 1874 until its abolition in 1889. Kyneton was abolished in the 1904 redistribution when several new districts were created or re-created including the Electoral district of Dalhousie. Reginald Argyle, the last member for Kyneton, represented Dalhousie 1904–1914.

Members for Kyneton

References

Former electoral districts of Victoria (Australia)
1889 establishments in Australia
1904 disestablishments in Australia